José Martín Cuevas Cobos (born September 28, 1969), known by his stage name Pedro Fernández,  is a Mexican singer, songwriter, actor, and television host. Fernández began his international career as Pedrito Fernández at the age of seven.

Fernández has recorded thirty-nine albums, acted in seven soap operas, and twenty five films. He has won 4 Latin Grammy Awards. His stage name is composed of the names of two of his favorite singers, (Pedro) Infante and Vicente (Fernandez).

Early life
His first album, La de la Mochila Azul, named after the single, was released in 1978.  His starring role in the film La niña de la mochila azul (The Girl with the Blue Backpack) was released in 1979 and led to a lifetime career of recording and film contracts.

Career

In 2001, his album Yo No Fui won the Latin Grammy Award for Best Ranchero Album.

His album De Corazón was nominated for the Latin Grammy Award for Best Ranchero/Mariachi Album at the 2003 Latin Grammy Awards.

In 2009, Fernández starred in Televisa's telenovela Hasta que el dinero nos separe with actress and singer Itatí Cantoral. He won the TVyNovelas Award for Best Lead Actor of 2010 for his portrayal of "Rafael Medina Nuñez" in the telenovela. The couple took home a triumph as Best Couple of the Year and Best Telenovela.

In 2010, Fernández won the Latin Grammy Award for Best Regional Mexican Song (2010) for "Amarte a la Antigua",

In 2012, Fernández starred as the protagonist in the telenovela Cachito de cielo. Fernández wrote the theme song "Cachito de Cielo" for the telenovela and as the theme song's songwriter and performer, he won the Latin Grammy Award for Best Regional Mexican Song in 2013.

In July 2014, Fernández starred in the Mexican telenovela Hasta el fin del mundo produced by Televisa. Fernández also wrote and performed the theme song for the series and produced an album by the name Hasta El Fin Del Mundo.

In 2015, his album Acaríciame El Corazón won the Latin Grammy Award for Best Ranchero/Mariachi Album at the 16th Annual Latin Grammy Awards. Fernández appeared on TV as a team coach for La Voz Kids for seasons three (2015) and four (2016), and as an official presenter/host for the Billboard Latin Music Awards for 2015 and 2016.

In September 2016, Fernández collaborated with Grupo Cañaveral for their 20-year anniversary album, recording a Cumbia version of Fernández's song "Si Te Vas".

The Honduran paper La Prensa has called Fernández "one of the most recognized artists not only in Mexico but throughout Latin America for his music and acting which continues today".

In November 2017, Fernández recorded “El Mudo” with La Sonora Santanera on their Latin Grammy nominated album “La Fiesta  Continúa”.

2018 was an eventful year for Fernández. This year he began celebrating 40 years of his artistic career with a year of concerts and television appearances. In February he was named “Mr. Amigo”. Each year, the Mr. Amigo Association honors a Mexican citizen to promote international friendship and goodwill between the U.S. and Mexico.

In March, Fernández released the first single titled from his upcoming new album Arránquense Muchachos. March also saw the release of “Toquen Mariachis Canten” (En Vivo), a duet Fernández recorded with Leo Dan for his new album “Celebrando a una Leyenda” (En Vivo).

In May, Fernández recorded another duet “Un Millón De Rosas” with the Grammy winning Tejano Group, La Mafia on their new album “Vozes”.

July brought the release of “Como Ella”, the second single from his new album Arránquense Muchachos. In August the complete album was released.

In September, the title cut from the album ¡Arránquense Muchachos¡ was nominated by the 19th Annual Latin Grammy Awards for Best Regional Song.

In 2019, along with the continuation of his multi-country “40th Anniversary Tour”, Fernández was selected to perform the opening theme “Como Te Extraño Mi Amor” for the Telemundo new political drama Preso No. 1 an American political thriller television series produced by Keshet International and Telemundo Global Studios  which premiered on 30 July 2019.  On August 30, 2019 Spanish singer Natalia Jiménez released her album “México De Mi Corazón” (Mexico of my heart), that includes a duet with Fernández, “Ya Lo Sé Que Tú Te Vas” (I know that you are leaving).

In March 2020, Fernández released the cover for his upcoming 40th album with a single titled “Como Te Extraño Mi Amor” (How I miss you my love), written by Leo Dan and encouraged by the popularity of his shorter version performed by Fernández for the theme of the Telemundo political drama Preso No. 1 last year.

In 2021 Fernández takes the lead role as the title character in Malverde: El Santo Patrón, an American biographical-drama television series based on the life of the Mexican bandit Jesús Malverde. Produced by Telemundo Global Studios.

Awards
Among his many national and international awards over his long career Pedro Fernández has been awarded the TVyNovelas Award for Best Actor (2010) for Hasta Que el Dinero Nos Separe, Latin Grammy Award for Best Ranchero/Mariachi Album (2001) for Yo No Fui, Latin Grammy Award for Best Regional Mexican Song (2010) for "Amarte a la Antigua", Latin Grammy Award for Best Regional Mexican Song (2013) (writer and performer) for "Cachito de Cielo", and the Latin Grammy Award for Best Ranchero/Mariachi Album (2015) for Acaríciame El Corazón.

Discography

as Pedrito Fernández
 La de la Mochila Azul (1978)
 Mamá Solita (1979)
 La Mugrosita (1980)
 Guadalajara (1981)
Mis 9 Años (1981)
 La de los Hoyitos (1982)
 Ay Jalisco no te rajes (1982)
 Rosa María (1982)
 Pucheritos (1983)
 Coqueta (1983)
 Delincuente (1984)
 Es Un Sábado Más (1985)
 El mejor de Todos (1986)

as Pedro Fernández
 Querida Canciones de Juan Gabriel (1987)
 Vicio   (1989)
 Por Un Amigo Más (1990)
 Muñecos de Papel (1991)
 Lo Mucho Que Te Quiero (1993)
 Buscando el Paraíso (1993)
 Mi Forma De Sentir (1994)
 Pedro Fernández (1995)
 Deseos Y Delirios (1996)
Un Mundo Raro: Tributo a José Alfredo Jiménez (1997)
 Aventurero (1998)
 Laberintos de Pasión (1999)
Lo Más Romántico de Pedro Fernández (1999)
Yo No Fuí (2000)
 Mi Cariño (2001)
 De Corazón (2002)
 Escúchame (2006)
 Dime Mi Amor (2008)
 Amarte a la Antigua (2009)
 Hasta Que el Dinero Nos Separe (2010)
No Que No... (2012)
 No Que No edición especial (2012)Hasta el Fin del Mundo (2014)Acaríciame El Corazón (2015)¡Arránquense Muchachos!'' (2018)

Filmography

Films

Television

See also
List of Famous Mexicans
Si Te Vas (Pedro Fernández song)

References

External links
 
   and English in history section.
 

1969 births
Mexican male film actors
Ranchera singers
Mexican male singers
Mexican child singers
Mexican male child actors
Mexican pop singers
Latin Grammy Award winners
Mexican male telenovela actors
Living people
Male actors from Guadalajara, Jalisco
Singers from Guadalajara, Jalisco
Universal Music Latin Entertainment artists
Latin music songwriters